Peter Fleming and John McEnroe were the defending champions, but did not participate this year.

Joakim Nyström and Mats Wilander won the title, defeating Wojtek Fibak and Sandy Mayer 3–6, 6–2, 6–2 in the final.

Seeds
All seeds receive a bye into the second round.

Draw

Finals

Top half

Bottom half

References
Draw

U.S. Pro Indoor
1985 Grand Prix (tennis)